The Vila Vila Formation is an Early Devonian (Lochkovian to Pragian) geologic formation of northern Bolivia. The formation comprises a succession of fine-grained sandstones and shales deposited in a shallow to deep marine environment.

Fossil content 
The formation has provided the following fossils:
 Pleurothyrella sp.
 Scaphiocoelia sp.

See also 
 List of fossiliferous stratigraphic units in Bolivia

References

Bibliography

Further reading 
 G. D. Edgecombe and L. Ramskold. 1994. Earliest Devonian phacopide trilobites from central Bolivia. Paläontologische Zeitschrift 68(3/4):397-410

Geologic formations of Bolivia
Devonian System of South America
Devonian Bolivia
Lochkovian Stage
Pragian Stage
Sandstone formations
Shale formations
Shallow marine deposits
Devonian southern paleotemperate deposits
Paleontology in Bolivia
Formations